The Tech is a river in southern France, very close to the French-Spanish border. Its source is the Parcigoule Valley, elevation , and it feeds the Mediterranean Sea.

Geography 
The Tech flows through 25 different towns, from its source to the sea: Prats-de-Mollo-la-Preste, Serralongue, Le Tech, Saint-Laurent-de-Cerdans, Montferrer, Corsavy, Arles-sur-Tech, Montbolo, Amélie-les-Bains-Palalda, Reynès, Céret, Saint-Jean-Pla-de-Corts, Maureillas-las-Illas, Le Boulou, Tresserre, Saint-Génis-des-Fontaines, Montesquieu-des-Albères, Banyuls-dels-Aspres, Villelongue-dels-Monts, Brouilla, Ortaffa, Palau-del-Vidre, Elne and Argelès-sur-Mer. It flows into the Mediterranean Sea between Saint-Cyprien and Argelès-sur-Mer, southeast of Perpignan.

In culture 
Poetry
 Ode au Tech [Ode to the Tech] (1912), a poem by the writer Marc Anfossi.

References

External links 

Rivers of Pyrénées-Orientales
Céret
0Tech
Rivers of Occitania (administrative region)
Rivers of France